{{Taxobox
| image =
| regnum = Animalia
| phylum = Arthropoda
| classis = Insecta
| ordo = Lepidoptera
| familia = Noctuidae
| subfamilia = Hadeninae
| genus = Diadocis 
| genus_authority = Saalmüller, 1891
| type_species = Diadocis longimacula| type_species_authority = Saalmüller, 1891
}}Diadocis is a genus of moths of the family Noctuidae.

SpeciesDiadocis longimacula 	Saalmüller, 1891Diadocis remyi (Viette, 1954)Diadocis sarodrano'' 	Viette, 1982

References
Natural History Museum Lepidoptera genus database
Saalmüller M. & von Heyden L. 1891. Lepidopteren von Madagascar. Zweite Abtheilung. Heterocera: Noctuae, Geometrae, Microlepidoptera. - — :247–531, pls. 7–14: 294-295

Specific

Hadeninae
Noctuoidea genera